This is a list of museums in Burundi.

List

See also 
 List of museums

External links 
 Museums in Burundi

 
Burundi
Museums
Museums
Museums
Burundi